SFHEA  may refer to:
Scottish Further and Higher Education Association, a Scottish trade union for lecturers in further and higher education
Senior Fellow of the Higher Education Academy, a grade in a UK professional recognition scheme for university teachers